Martha Lake Airport Park is a county park located in Martha Lake, Snohomish County, Washington. It was originally a private-use airport known as the Martha Lake Airport that was closed in the late 1990s and sold to the county in 2000. The  park was opened in 2010 and features athletic fields for soccer and softball and a skate park. A large glacial erratic on the property, one of several in the county, is used for bouldering (rock climbing).

History

Use as private airport

The Martha Lake Airport was a private airport operated by Ed Hauter, Sr. and his family on their farm that they purchased in 1955. The airport, which had been encroached by suburban development from the 1960s onwards, was closed in 1998 after the death of Dorothy Hauter.

Conversion into park

Snohomish County purchased the property from the Hauter family for $3.6 million in 2000, who had declined offers from real estate developers. Plans for the park were drawn up in 2004 and approved by the county in June 2008, allowing for construction to begin in February 2009. The park was dedicated and opened on October 9, 2010 by county officials.

See also
List of airports in Washington (state)
Glacial erratic boulders in Snohomish County, Washington

References

External links
Snohomish County Parks
Abandoned & Little-Known Airfields: Martha Lake Airport
SummitPost: Airport Boulder

Parks in Snohomish County, Washington
Airports in Snohomish County, Washington
Defunct airports in Washington (state)